Satyamev Jayate is a 1987 Indian Hindi-language action film, directed by Raj N. Sippy. It stars Vinod Khanna, Meenakshi Sheshadri and Madhavi, with Anita Raj, A. K. Hangal, Renu Joshi, Alankar, Neeta Puri, Saahil Chadha, Satyen Kappu, Sudhir Dalvi, Vinod Mehra, Shakti Kapoor and Anupam Kher.

The film is a remake of the Malayalam film Aavanazhi. The film was a comeback film for Vinod Khanna and emerged a box office success. Vinod Khanna’s performance as a police officer was critically acclaimed and is regarded as one of his best. Meenakshi Sheshadri’s performance as a prostitute; was also acclaimed. The chemistry between Khanna and Sheshadri was appreciated. The song "Dil Mein Ho Tum” gained popularity.

Plot
Inspector Arjun Singh (Vinod Khanna) of Mumbai Police has attained the sordid reputation of being one of the most ruthless policemen in India. He is known for his torture and brutality. When a young man is killed in custody, Arjun is spoken to and warned, and subsequently transferred to the small town of Tehsil. Arjun denies these charges and asserts in vain, that the death was not his fault.

Arjun re-locates there, and finds to his horror that the family of the young man who died in his care, are his neighbors, and that this town regards him as enemy number one. Arjun must now come to terms with his past and compromise in this town, and find out what were the circumstances behind this young man's death or just get another transfer. However, he is abandoned by his lover Vidya (Anita Raj), and a determined Pooja (Madhvi) is doing all she can to bring justice to her brother's murder. Arjun finds solace in alcoholism and a prostitute, Seema (Meenakshi Sheshadri).

Cast
 Vinod Khanna as Inspector Arjun Singh 
 Meenakshi Sheshadri as Seema
 Madhavi as Pooja Shastri 
 Anita Raj as Vidya Kaul 
 Anupam Kher as Advocate Amar Kaul 
 Shakti Kapoor as Chaman Bagga 
 Gulshan Grover as Satyaprakash
 Vinod Mehra as Inspector Mirza
 Om Shivpuri as Minister Yashpal
 Asrani as Mewaram 
 Bharat Kapoor as Inspector Ravi Verma
 Viju Khote as Police Constable Dabu
 A. K. Hangal as Mr Shastri
 Subbiraj as Police Commissioner Prithvi Singh
 Ram Mohan as SP Rana
 Sudhir Dalvi as Mr. Mishra

Soundtrack
Lyrics: Farooq Kaiser

References

External links

1980s Hindi-language films
1987 action films
1987 films
Fictional portrayals of the Maharashtra Police
Films directed by Raj N. Sippy
Films scored by Bappi Lahiri
Films set in Mumbai
Hindi remakes of Malayalam films
Indian police films